Yash may refer to:

People
 Yash (name), including a list of people with that name
 Yash (Kannada actor), Indian Kannada-language actor
 Yash Dasgupta, Indian Hindi and Bengali film actor 
 Yash Birla, chairman of the Indian conglomerate Yash Birla Group
 Yash Chopra, indian hindi Film director and producer
 Yash Gera, Indian actor
 Yash Ghai, Kenyan academic in constitutional law
 Yash Gupta, Indian cricketer
 Yash Johar, Hindi film producer
 Yash Kumar, Nepali musical artist
 Yash Kumarr, Bhojpuri actor
 Yash Mistry, Indian child actor
 Yash Pal, Indian scientist and educator
 Yash Pandit, Indian actor
 Yash A Patnaik, Indian producer
 Yash Sinha, Indian actor
 Yash Soni, Indian actor
 Yash Tandon, Ugandan policymaker and political activist
 Yash Tonk, Indian actor

Business
 Yash Raj Films, Hindi film production house

Film
 Yash (film), a 1996 Indian Bollywood musical film

See also

 Yashaswi, also Yashasvi or Yeshaswi, a name